The 2014 New Orleans mayoral election was held on February 1, 2014, to elect the Mayor of New Orleans, Louisiana. Incumbent Democratic Mayor Mitch Landrieu was re-elected to a second term.

Candidates

Democratic

Declared
 Michael Bagneris, former Civil District Court judge (resigned to run)
 Danatus N. King Sr., attorney and President of the NAACP New Orleans Branch
 Mitch Landrieu, incumbent Mayor

Independent

Withdrew
 Manny "Chevrolet" Bruno, textbook salesman and candidate for Mayor in 2002, 2006 and 2010

Results

References 

2014 Louisiana elections
2014
New Orleans
21st century in New Orleans
February 2014 events in the United States